Niavaran is an affluent and upperclass district in the north of Tehran.  Bordering leafy, uphill-winding Darband Street, it can be reached from Tajrish Square, and is close to Darabad at the far north-eastern corner of Greater Tehran.

Culture 
The aqueduct of flumes was the base for Niavaran district nearly hundreds years ago, this led to the extensive flourishment of this land and consequently superb condition of living.  These didn't stay away from the eyes of ruling dynasties in Iran, more particularly Qajar families in the 19 century. They initiated major constructions of summer house villas and palaces and from there a deluxe lifestyle  become the set-mark of this region in Tehran. Niavaran as a whole consists of three sub-regions and those are Manzariyeh, Niavaran and Jamal Abad-all of them are situated in the first district of Tehran Precisely in the north. It is home to the affluent as well as many artists, and replete with cultural riches such as Niavaran Palace Complex, Niavaran Park, and the Farhangsara (cultural centre) that includes an amphitheatre, museum, music hall, and Café Gallerie, a courtyard coffee shop with indoor exhibition space.

In recent years, the Niavaran area has become famous by groups of artists who use the traditional backdrop of the area for taking photos on their mobile phones. It has been extensively photographed by many artists using the Instagram.

Notable sights 
The architecture is unique in that the area's graded slopes have given rise to multilevel layouts and idiosyncratic lofts. Being situated on the city foothills (1700 metres above sea level), Niavaran has a cooler climate all year round compared to the rest of Tehran, and excellent vantage points.

References

Neighbourhoods in Tehran